Pavel David (born 17 October 1978) is a Czech former footballer. David, who played as a forward, spent several years in Germany, playing for the first and second teams of 1. FC Nürnberg. He has also played for SC Pfullendorf, Rot-Weiß Erfurt, Dynamo Dresden and Hallescher FC.

Honours
 2. Bundesliga: 2001
 Regionalliga Nord: 2011–12

References

External links

1978 births
Living people
Czech footballers
Czech First League players
SK Slavia Prague players
1. FC Nürnberg players
FC Rot-Weiß Erfurt players
Dynamo Dresden players
Hallescher FC players
Bundesliga players
2. Bundesliga players
Expatriate footballers in Germany
SC Pfullendorf players
Association football midfielders
Association football forwards